is a 1988 Japanese comedy film written and directed by Juzo Itami. It is the sequel to Itami's 1987 comedy A Taxing Woman. Nobuko Miyamoto plays female government tax investigator Ryoko Itakura.  She investigates a religious sect, led by Teppei Onizawa (Rentarō Mikuni), that is suspected of being used for tax evasion.  The sect is part of a complex conspiracy involving the yakuza, political corruption, and a prestigious construction project.

Release
A Taxing Woman's Return was released in Japan on January 15, 1988 where it was distributed by Toho.

Reception
The film won a few Japanese awards. This included the Mainichi Film Concours Best Supporting Actor for Yasuo Daichi (also for Bakayaro! I'm Plenty Mad) and a Japanese Academy Awards for Best Editing (Akira Suzuki) who won the award for this film and Brake Out, Love Bites Back and The Silk Road.

References

Footnotes

Sources

External links

1988 films
Films directed by Jūzō Itami
1988 comedy films
1980s Japanese films